Lee Yong-hun (born 7 February 1942) is a South Korean jurist who formerly served as the Chief Justice of the Supreme Court of South Korea.

Early life
Lee was born in Jeollanam-do. He attended High School #1 in Gwangju before going on to Seoul National University's faculty of law.

Career
Prior to his appointment as Chief Justice, Lee served as a Seoul High Court judge, Supreme Court justice, and chairman of the Government Employees Ethics Committee. During his confirmation hearings, he was questioned about high legal fees he had earned—roughly six billion won on 400 cases in five years in private practise, with legislators implying that he had received special treatment from sitting judges—as well as about his purchase of a  apartment in Seoul's exclusive Seocho-dong neighbourhood.

Following his retirement from the bench, he started a movement to recognise Article 9 of the Japanese Constitution by awarding it the Nobel Peace Prize.

References

1942 births
Living people
People from South Jeolla Province
Seoul National University School of Law alumni
Chief justices of the Supreme Court of Korea
Justices of the Supreme Court of Korea
South Korean judges